Chido Onumah (born 10 April 1966) is a journalist, author, and rights activist. He has worked for over two decades as a journalist, rights activist and media trainer in Nigeria, Ghana, Canada, India, the US, the Caribbean and Europe. He holds a PhD in Communication and Journalism from the Autonomous University of Barcelona, UAB, Spain. He was arrested and detained by Nigeria's State Security Services (SSS) at Abuja airport on his arrival from Spain for wearing a T-shirt with the inscription "We Are All Biafrans".

Education
Onumah studied at the University of Calabar, Cross River State, Nigeria, and received an MA in journalism from the University of Western Ontario, London, Ontario, Canada. He holds a PhD in communication and journalism from the Autonomous University of Barcelona, UAB, Spain.

Career
Onumah worked and wrote for several media houses in Nigeria, including; The Sentinel magazine, the Guardian, AM News, PM News, The News/Tempo, Concord, Punch and Thisday newspapers, before moving to Accra, Ghana, in 1996. He served as associate editor of the Insight newspaper, assistant editor of Third World Network's African Agenda magazine, coordinator, West African Human Rights Committee and correspondent for African Observer magazine, New York, and AfricaNews Service, Nairobi, Kenya.

In 2003, Onumah spent time in Haiti and Dominican Republic where he reported on people living with HIV/AIDS, and on a cross-cultural dialogue between African and Caribbean journalists. Between December 2001 and January 2002, Onumah was in New Delhi, India, on fellowship with the Indian Express newspaper, reporting on international issues.

From 2002 to 2004, Onumah worked as Director of Africa programmes at the Panos Institute in Washington, DC.

Between 2006 and 2008, he served as pioneer coordinator of the crime prevention unit (Fix Nigeria Initiative) of the Economic and Financial Crimes Commission (EFCC) in Nigeria, working on a civil society anti-corruption agenda for the country, and in partnership with the Wole Soyinka Centre for Investigative Journalism developed programs on ethics and investigative reporting for Nigerian journalists.

Between 2001 and 2002, Onumah volunteered for the London Cross Cultural Learner Centre, London, Ontario, Canada, working on integration and provision of information for refugees and new immigrants to Canada. In 2005, he began volunteering for the World Computer Exchange WCE, seeking donations of used computers and assisting in recruiting African community organizations, universities, and secondary schools.

Onumah is currently the Coordinator of the African Centre for Media & Information Literacy [[African Centre for Media & Information Literacy |AFRICMIL, Abuja, Nigeria. The African Centre for Media & Information Literacy focuses on media, information, research, advocacy, and training. It seeks to empower citizens through the promotion of media and information literacy. Its objective is to deploy the opportunity that new media and information technologies offer in tackling socio-economic issues. It aims to promote media and information literacy as a key component in the enhancement of democracy and good governance and the promotion of accountability and orderly society.

Onumah is a columnist with several newspapers.

Awards
 2017: Devatop Anti-Human Trafficking Ambassador, Nigeria.
 2002: The Jerry Rogers Writing Award, University of Western Ontario, Canada
 2001: William C. Heine Fellowship for International Media Studies, University of Western Ontario, Canada
 2001: Alfred W. Hamilton Scholarship - Canadian Association of Black Journalists
 1999: Kudirat Initiative for Democracy KIND Award for excellence in journalism (Nigeria)
 1997: Clement Mwale Prize for courage in journalism, AFRICANEWS SERVICE (Kenya)

Publications
Onumah is the author of the following books:
 "Remaking Nigeria: Sixty Years, Sixty Voices" (ed.)
 "Testimony to Courage: Essays in Honour of Dapo Olorunyomi (with Fred Adetiba)", (ed.)
 "We Are All Biafrans (2016), 
 Nigeria is Negotiable (2013) and 
 Time to Reclaim Nigeria (Essays 2001-2011) 2011.

He has edited books on various subjects, including 
 Making Your Voice Heard: A Media Toolkit for Children & Youth (2004); 
 Anti-Corruption Advocacy Handbook (with Comfort Idika-Ogunye) 2006;
 Youth Media: A Guide to Literacy and Social Change (with Lewis Asubiojo) 2008;
 Understanding Nigeria and the New Imperialism (with Biodun Jeyifo, Bene Madunagu, and Kayode Komolafe) 2006;
 Sentenced in God’s Name: The Untold Story of Nigeria’s "Witch Children"  (with Lewis Asubiojo) 2011; and
 Media and Information Policy and Strategy Guidelines'' (with Grizzle, A., Moore, P., Dezuanni, M., Asthana, S., Wilson, C. and Banda, F.).

African Centre for Media & Information Literacy
Onumah is coordinator of the African Centre for Media & Information Literacy (AFRICMIL). AFRICMIL was set up in 2008 following the resolution of the 1st Africa media & Information Literacy Conference in July 2008 in Abuja, organised in conjunction with British Council, Nigeria, and the National Film & Video Censors Board (NFVCB).

Pan-African Alliance for Media & Information Literacy
Chido Onumah is the chair of the Pan-African Alliance for Media & Information Literacy (PAMIL) and former Co-Chair of Global Alliance on Media and Information Literacy (GAPMIL).

Controversies

We Are All Biafrans
Onumah has generated intense and continuous discussions on governance, human rights abuses, and corruption, through his expository articles and essays. He has often questioned the credibility of some political office holders and frowned at exclusion of youth in governance. One of his books titled: We Are All Biafrans, which talks about restructuring Nigeria, has continued to generate debate among political leaders, the media and civil society across Nigeria. The book uses Biafra as a metaphor for the various agitations in Nigeria. It calls for political restructuring as a basis for enhancing Nigeria's unity and building an egalitarian society.

Arrest by State Security Services
Onumah was arrested and detained by Nigeria's State Security Services (SSS) on 29 September 2019 at 5pm at Nnamdi Azikiwe International Airport, Abuja for wearing a T-shirt with the inscription "We Are All Biafrans". He traveled to Barcelona where he bagged a PhD in Communication and Journalism from the Autonomous University of Barcelona, UAB, and was waiting for his luggage when SSS arrested him and detained him till 11pm. He was later released and the SSS denied arresting him.

References

Sources 
  
 
  
 
 
 
 
 
 
 
 
 
 
 
 Media and information literacy: policy and strategy guidelines
 
 
 
 
 
 Global Forum for Partnership on MIL (GFPMIL)

External links 
African Centre for Media & Information Literacy
http://www.unesco.org/new/en/media-services/single-view/news/unesco_and_partners_launched_global_alliance_for_partnerships_on_media_and_information_literacy/back/18256/#.VHFGF2fUg-M
Economic and Financial Crimes Commission (EFCC) website

Nigerian journalists
University of Calabar
1966 births
Living people
Nigerian philosophers
Nigerian human rights activists
English-language writers from Nigeria
Nigerian humanists